Mahin, Mahin, Mihan or Mihin may refer to:

Mahin, Syria
Mehin, East Azerbaijan
Mahin, Fars
Mehin, Qazvin
Mihan, Tehran

See also
Mikhin (disambiguation)